The Hurlbut–Yates House is a historic house in Lincoln, Nebraska. It was built in 1891 for Aeneas Hurlbut, who had served in the American Civil War of 1861–1865 before moving to Nebraska. It was designed in the Queen Anne and Stick/Eastlake styles by architect Ferdinand C. Fiske. In 1893, it was purchased by Charles Yates, who lived here with his wife Ruth, their two sons and two daughters. The house was listed on the National Register of Historic Places on September 17, 1999 as Aeneas Hurlbut–Charles Yates House.

It is termed the "Hurlbut–Yates House" by the City of Lincoln, which designated the house to be a Local Landmark.  In its 1987 Local Landmark application, the property was deemed "one of the finest Queen Anne style houses in Nebraska, with a high degree of integrity, reinforced by an exemplary rehabilitation and restoration."  It also noted that "Charles Yates was a leading businessman in Lincoln and his sons and grandsons continued to make significant and positive impact on the community."

Notes

References

External links

National Register of Historic Places in Lincoln, Nebraska
Queen Anne architecture in Nebraska
Stick-Eastlake architecture in the United States
Houses completed in 1891